Carlos Alberto Cabral, 2nd count of Vizela, was the original owner of Casa de Serralves, Porto, Portugal.

Portuguese nobility